River Road is a census-designated place (CDP) in Beaufort County, North Carolina, United States. The population was 4,048 at the 2020 Census.

Geography
River Road is located at  (35.511985, -76.999251), on the north bank of the tidal Pamlico River.

North Carolina Highway 32 (River Road) is the main road through the CDP, leading west into Washington and northeast to U.S. Route 264.

Demographics

As of the census of 2000, there were 4,094 people, 1,660 households, and 1,183 families residing in the CDP. The population density was 578.5 people per square mile (223.3/km). There were 1,946 housing units at an average density of 275.0 per square mile (106.1/km). The racial makeup of the CDP was 67.98% White, 26.23% African American, 0.29% Native American, 0.22% Asian, 0.15% Pacific Islander, 4.49% from other races, and 0.64% from two or more races. Hispanic or Latino of any race were 9.82% of the population.

There were 1,660 households, out of which 29.4% had children under the age of 18 living with them, 55.9% were married couples living together, 11.5% had a female householder with no husband present, and 28.7% were non-families. 24.1% of all households were made up of individuals, and 8.4% had someone living alone who was 65 years of age or older. The average household size was 2.47 and the average family size was 2.89.

In the CDP, the population was spread out, with 23.2% under the age of 18, 9.6% from 18 to 24, 26.9% from 25 to 44, 25.6% from 45 to 64, and 14.6% who were 65 years of age or older. The median age was 39 years. For every 100 females, there were 98.9 males. For every 100 females age 18 and over, there were 97.4 males.

The median income for a household in the CDP was $39,178, and the median income for a family was $50,385. Males had a median income of $32,364 versus $26,316 for females. The per capita income for the CDP was $19,316. About 17.1% of families and 22.3% of the population were below the poverty line, including 43.6% of those under age 18 and 5.4% of those age 65 or over.

References

Census-designated places in Beaufort County, North Carolina
Census-designated places in North Carolina